Marianna Rebičová (born 15 August 1993) is a Slovak female handball player for MKS Lublin and the Slovak national team.

She represented Slovakia at the 2021 World Women's Handball Championship in Spain.

References

1993 births
Living people
Slovak female handball players
Expatriate handball players
Slovak expatriate sportspeople in Slovenia
Slovak expatriate sportspeople in Hungary
People from Michalovce
Sportspeople from the Košice Region
Slovak expatriate sportspeople in Poland